Eslamabad (also Romanized as Eslāmābād) is a village in Atrak Rural District, Maneh District, Maneh and Samalqan County, North Khorasan Province, Iran. At the 2006 census, its population was 498, in 131 families.

References 

Populated places in Maneh and Samalqan County